Kishore Mahbubani  (born 24 October 1948) is a Singaporean diplomat and geopolitical consultant who served as Singapore Permanent Representative to the United Nations between 1984 and 1989, and again between 1998 and 2004, and President of the United Nations Security Council between 2001 and 2002.

After stepping down, he remained serving as a senior advisor at the National University of Singapore while engaging in a nine-month sabbatical at various universities, including Harvard University's Ash Center for Democratic Governance and Innovation. He is currently a Distinguished Fellow at the Asia Research Institute. In 2019, Mahbubani was elected as a member of the American Academy of Arts and Sciences.

Between 2004 and 2017, he served as Dean of the Lee Kuan Yew School of Public Policy at the National University of Singapore.

Early life and education
Mahbubani was born in Singapore to a Sindhi-speaking Hindu family who were displaced from Sindh province during the Partition of India. 

He attended Tanjong Katong Technical School and  St. Andrew's School before he was awarded the President's Scholarship in 1967 to study at the University of Singapore (now the National University of Singapore), where he graduated in 1971 with a Bachelor of Arts with first class honours degree in philosophy. 

He subsequently went on to complete a Master of Arts degree in philosophy at Dalhousie University in 1976.

Mahbubani was conferred an honorary Doctor of Philosophy from Dalhousie University in 1995.

Career

Public service
After his graduation in 1971, Mahbubani joined the Ministry of Foreign Affairs (MFA) as a foreign service officer. His earlier postings included Cambodia, Malaysia and the United States. From 1993 to 1998, he held the position of Permanent Secretary at MFA. Later, he served as Singapore's Permanent Representative to the United Nations. In that role, he served as President of the United Nations Security Council in January 2001 and May 2002.

Academic career
Mahbubani's academic career began when he was appointed as the Dean of the Lee Kuan Yew School of Public Policy, National University of Singapore. He is also a Professor in the Practice of Public Policy. In addition, he was a fellow at the Center for International Affairs at Harvard University in 1991–92. He currently also serves on the board of the International Advisory Council at Bocconi.

Author
Mahbubani is best known outside Singapore for his books Can Asians Think?, Beyond The Age of Innocence: Rebuilding Trust between America and the World, and The New Asian Hemisphere: The Irresistible Shift of Global Power to the East. His articles have appeared in newspapers such as Foreign Affairs, Foreign Policy, the Washington Quarterly, Survival, American Interest, the National Interest, Time, Newsweek, the Financial Times and the New York Times. His latest book, Has China Won?, was published in 2020.

In The Great Convergence: Asia, the West, and the Logic of One World, Mahbubani describes how the world has seen more positive change in the past 30 years than the past 300 years. By prescribing pragmatic solutions for improving the global order – including a 7-7-7 formula that may finally break the logjam in the United Nations Security Council – Mahbubani maps a road away from the geopolitical contours of the nineteenth century. The book was reviewed, including in the Financial Times, the Wall Street Journal and the Washington Post. The Great Convergence was selected as one of the Financial Times''' books of 2013 and longlisted for the 2014 Lionel Gelber Prize.

Mahbubani also writes regularly for Singapore's The Straits Times. In the lead up to Singapore's 50th anniversary of independence, he began a series on "big ideas" that he hoped would help Singapore succeed in the following half-century.

Board memberships
Mahbubani continues to serve in boards and councils of several institutions in Singapore, Europe and North America, including the Yale President's Council on International Activities, Association of Professional Schools of International Affairs, Indian Prime Minister's Global Advisory Council, Bocconi University's International Advisory Committee, World Economic Forum's Global Agenda Council on China, and Lee Kuan Yew World City Prize's nominating committee.

Mahbubani also spoke as part of Asian Institute of Finance's Distinguished Speaker Series in 2015 with the title "Can ASEAN re-invent itself?" to over hundreds of financial institution practitioners in Kuala Lumpur.

In 2019, Mahbubani was elected a member of the American Academy of Arts and Sciences.

Honours
  Public Administration Medal (Gold) (1998)

Mahbubani was conferred the Public Administration Medal (Gold) by the Singapore government in 1998. The Foreign Policy Association Medal was awarded to him in New York in June 2004 with the following opening words in the citation: "A gifted diplomat, a student of history and philosophy, a provocative writer and an intuitive thinker". Mahbubani was also listed as one of the top 100 public intellectuals in the world by Foreign Policy and Prospect magazines in September 2005, and included in the March 2009 Financial Times list of Top 50 individuals who would shape the debate on the future of capitalism. Mahbubani was selected as one of Foreign Policy Top 100 Global Thinkers in 2010 and 2011 and one of Prospects top 50 world thinkers in 2014.

The secondary school library of the Tampines campus of the United World College of South East Asia (UWCSEA) is named after Mahbubani. He is also a former chair of the UWCSEA foundation.

Personal life
Mahbubani was previously married to Gretchen Gustafson, a journalist and author on 21 June 1975.

Mahbubani later married Anne King Markey on 30 March 1985. When Mahbubani first met Anne, she was part of the U.S. Commodity Futures Trading Commission and he was serving as the deputy chief of the Singaporean mission in Washington, D.C. The couple has two sons and one daughter.

Mahbubani said in an interview that he enjoys jogging as a way of relaxing and easing his mind. He also has a habit of writing while listening to the music of Mohammed Rafi which his mother often put on the radio when he was a child.

In April 2016, Mahbubani suffered severe chest pains while jogging. He later underwent a double heart bypass operation.

Books
 Can Asians Think? Understanding the Divide Between East and West., Steerforth, 2001, ; Times Editions; 3rd edition, 2004, 
 Beyond the Age of Innocence: Rebuilding Trust Between America and the World, Perseus Books Group, 2005, 
 The New Asian Hemisphere: The Irresistible Shift of Global Power to the East, PublicAffairs, 2008, 
 The Great Convergence: Asia, the West, and the Logic of One World, PublicAffairs, 2013, 
 Can Singapore Survive?, Straits Times Books, 2015, 
 The ASEAN Miracle: A Catalyst for Peace, Ridge Books, 2017, 
 Has the West Lost It? A Provocation, Penguin Books, 2018, 
 Has China Won?: The Chinese Challenge to American Primacy, PublicAffairs, 2020, 
 The Asian 21st Century'', Springer, 2022,

References

External links
 Kishore Mahbubani's Official Website – 
 Kishore Mahbubani's Official Website – 
 Lee Kuan Yew School of Public Policy
 Podcast of Kishore Mahbubani discussing “the Irresistible Shift of Global Power to the East” at the Shanghai International Literary Festival
 Transcript of interview on VPRO's Tegenlicht (Dutch Television)

1948 births
Living people
International relations scholars
Theorists on Western civilization
Singaporean diplomats
Singaporean Hindus
Singaporean people of Sindhi descent
Singaporean sinologists
Harvard Fellows
Permanent Representatives of Singapore to the United Nations
Political realism
Academic staff of the National University of Singapore
University of Singapore alumni
Saint Andrew's School, Singapore alumni
Dalhousie University alumni
Singaporean people of Indian descent
Sindhi people
Recipients of the Pingat Pentadbiran Awam
Fellows of the American Academy of Arts and Sciences
Carnegie Council for Ethics in International Affairs